Boron trifluoride etherate, strictly boron trifluoride diethyl etherate, or boron trifluoride–ether complex, is the chemical compound with the formula BF3O(C2H5)2, often abbreviated BF3OEt2.  It is a colorless liquid, although older samples can appear brown.  The compound is used as a source of boron trifluoride in many chemical reactions that require a Lewis acid.  The compound features tetrahedral boron coordinated to a diethylether ligand.  Many analogues are known, including the methanol complex.

Reactions
Boron trifluoride etherate serves as a source of boron trifluoride according to the equilibrium:
BF3OEt2     BF3  +  OEt2
The BF3 binds to even weak Lewis bases, inducing reactions of the resulting adducts with nucleophiles.

References

Fluorides
Boron compounds
Boron halides
Acid catalysts